Levi Strauss (1829–1902) was founder of the first company to manufacture blue jeans.

Levi Strauss or Lévi-Strauss may also refer to:

People
 Claude Lévi-Strauss (1908–2009), French anthropologist and ethnologist
 Dina Lévi-Strauss (1911-1999), French anthropologist and ethnologist

Places
22647 Lévi-Strauss, a main-belt minor planet

Other uses
 Levi Strauss & Co. clothing company
Lévi-Strauss (book), a book by Edmund Leach

See also
 Levi (disambiguation)
 Levis (disambiguation)
 Strauss (disambiguation)